Corel DESIGNER is a vector-based graphics program. It was originally developed by Micrografx, which was bought by Corel in 2001.

The last version developed by Micrografx was 9.0 in 2001. This program was later sold as Corel DESIGNER 9. There are still a number of users who continue working with version 9.0, because newer versions of the product are based on a modified CorelDRAW rather than the original product. 

Corel DESIGNER is effective for the creation of engineering drawings, but also offers many functions for graphic design. Starting with version X5, Corel DESIGNER Technical Suite includes Corel Designer, CorelDRAW and Corel Photo-Paint. X6 was the last release for Windows XP.

Release history and file formats

References

External links

Corel DESIGNER Help (available in HTML and PDF format)

Graphics software
Corel software